Jovana  Stevanović (born 30 June 1992) is a Serbian professional volleyball player who won the 2016 Summer Olympics silver medal with the Serbia national team. Until 2022 she played for the Italian club Unet E-Work Busto Arsizio and will play for Vero Volley Monza in the season 2022–2023.

Career
In 2016, she won the silver medal at the 2016 Summer Olympics with the national team and the silver medal at the 2016 FIVB Volleyball Women's Club World Championship with Pomi Casalmaggiore. She was selected to play the Italian League All-Star game in 2017.

Individual Awards
 2013-14 prize as [Best Middle Blocker] of the Italian Volley League A1
 2015-16 prize as [Best Middle Blocker] of the Italian Volley League A1
 2015–16 CEV Women's Champions League "Best Middle Blockers"
 2022 FIVB Nations League - "Best Middle Blocker"

Personal life
She is a daughter of the ex football player and nowadays coach Goran Stevanović and sister of ex footballer Anđelo Stevanović, now co-trainer for the young boys of Partizan Beograd.

References

External links
FIVB profile

1992 births
Serbian women's volleyball players
Living people
Sportspeople from Belgrade
Volleyball players at the 2015 European Games
European Games medalists in volleyball
European Games bronze medalists for Serbia
Volleyball players at the 2016 Summer Olympics
Olympic volleyball players of Serbia
Olympic silver medalists for Serbia
Olympic medalists in volleyball
Medalists at the 2016 Summer Olympics
Expatriate volleyball players in Italy
Serbian expatriate sportspeople in Italy
European champions for Serbia